Abir Har Even (born 1947) is a chess player who holds the title of International Correspondence Chess Grandmaster and was the Israeli champion of correspondence chess for the 1966 and 1974 championships. He lives in Emmanuel, Israel.

Har Even's ICCF rating is 2532 (updated 9.2007) and he holds the sixth place in Israel.

References

External links 
 ICCF ratings
 
 

1947 births
Living people
Israeli chess players
Jewish chess players
Israeli Jews
Correspondence chess grandmasters